The Williams Pinball Controller (WPC) is an arcade system board platform used for several pinball games designed by Williams and Midway (under the Bally name) between 1990 and early 1999. It is the successor to their earlier System 11 hardware (High Speed, Pin*Bot, Black Knight 2000). It was succeeded by Williams/Midway's Pinball 2000 platform, before Williams left the pinball business in October 1999.

FunHouse (designed by Pat Lawlor) was the first production game to use WPC, although there are prototype Dr. Dude machines that use WPC.

Hardware info
WPC systems contain several separate printed circuit boards that are characterized by:
Main CPU: Motorola 6809 at 2 MHz, 8KB of RAM, and between 128KB and 1MB of EPROM for the game program
WPC ASIC: Williams-proprietary 68-pin PLCC custom chip that implements functions like address decoding, real time clock, and watchdog
Sound CPU:  Motorola 6809 (Pre-DCS), Analog Devices ADSP2105 (DCS)
Sound chips (Pre-DCS): Yamaha YM2151, MP7524JN 8-bit-DAC, Harris HC55536 CVSD
Operating system: APPLE OS (created by Williams, not related to the company Apple, but "Advanced Pinball Programming Logic Executive")

Variations
There are six variations of the WPC hardware. The original version is sometimes referred to as WPC-89.  The WPC MPU remained the same through all generation up to the addition of the security chip in WPC-S, and then the subsequent WPC-95 board. The variations are as follows:

WPC (Alphanumeric)
FunHouse - September 1990
Harley-Davidson - February 1991
The Machine: Bride of Pin·Bot - February 1991
Some Dr. Dude machines were also made using this WPC generation, although most were still made using the System 11 board.

WPC (Dot Matrix)
Gilligan's Island - May 1991
Terminator 2: Judgment Day - July 1991
Hurricane - August 1991
The Party Zone - August 1991
Terminator 2: Judgment Day was the first to be designed with a dot matrix display, but was released after Gilligan's Island, due to Terminator 2 having a longer development time than Gilligan's Island.
This generation WPC hardware was also used in the SlugFest 1991 baseball card dispenser game, in the Hot Shot basketball game (designed 1991, produced 1994), as well as in the first shuffle alley game Strike Master, 1991.

WPC (Fliptronics)
The Getaway: High Speed II - February 1992
The Addams Family - March 1992
Black Rose - July 1992
Doctor Who - September 1992
Fish Tales - October 1992
Creature from the Black Lagoon - December 1992
White Water - January 1993
Bram Stoker's Dracula - March 1993
Twilight Zone - March 1993
The Addams Family Special Collectors Edition - October 1994
The Addams Family was the only game produced with the Fliptronics I board, which is compatible with Fliptronics II boards, which added a bridge rectifier for the flipper voltage.

WPC (DCS)
Indiana Jones: The Pinball Adventure - August 1993
Judge Dredd -  September 1993
Star Trek: The Next Generation - November 1993
Popeye Saves the Earth -  February 1994
Demolition Man - February 1994
Twilight Zone was designed to be the first pinball machine to use the new DCS system, but due to delays of the new hardware design it was decided to release it on the old hardware (using downsampled sound effects) instead. The redemption game Addams Family Values also used the DCS Sound System.

WPC-S (Security)
Starting with World Cup Soccer, a security programmable integrated circuit (PIC) chip was added to the CPU board in all WPC-S games at location U22. This PIC chip was game specific making it so CPU boards could not be  swapped between different models without changing the security PIC chip.

World Cup Soccer - February 1994
The Flintstones - July 1994
Corvette - August 1994
Red & Ted's Road Show - October 1994
The Shadow - November 1994
Dirty Harry - March 1995
Theatre of Magic - March 1995
No Fear: Dangerous Sports - May 1995
Indianapolis 500 - June 1995
Johnny Mnemonic - August 1995
Jack·Bot - October 1995
WHO Dunnit - September 1995

WPC-95
In this final revision of the WPC hardware, the dot matrix controller and the DCS sound boards are combined into a single A/V board, while the Power/Driver and the Fliptronics boards are combined into a single Power/Driver board, bringing the board count down to three boards. It also includes the same game-specific security PIC introduced in the WPC-Security system.

Congo - November 1995
Attack from Mars - December 1995
Safecracker - March 1996
Tales of the Arabian Nights -  May 1996
Scared Stiff - September 1996
Junk Yard - December 1996
NBA Fastbreak - March 1997
Medieval Madness - June 1997
Cirqus Voltaire - October 1997
No Good Gofers - December 1997
The Champion Pub - April 1998
Monster Bash -  July 1998
Cactus Canyon - October 1998
This generation WPC hardware was also used in the ticket redemption game Ticket Tac Toe, March 1996, the token payout game Phantom Haus, 1996, and the shuffle alley game League Champ, 1996.

References

External links
Repairing Williams/Bally WPC Pinball Games from 1990 to 1999
Maddes.net: How To Examine Or Debug A WPC ROM
WPC LED's explained technical information

Arcade system boards
WMS Industries
Pinball platforms